Leonardo Balsarini (1636 – December 1699) was a Roman Catholic prelate who served as Latin Archbishop of Corinth (1698–1699), Roman Catholic Bishop of Chios (1686–1698), and Titular Bishop of Philadelphia in Arabia (1668–1686).

Biography
Leonardo Balsarini was born in Chios, Greece in 1636. On 14 May 1668, he was appointed during the papacy of Pope Clement IX as Coadjutor Roman Catholic Bishop of Chios and Titular Bishop of Philadelphia in Arabia. On 24 June 1668, he was consecrated bishop by Cesare Facchinetti, Bishop of Spoleto, with Giacomo Altoviti, Titular Patriarch of Antiochia, and Stefano Brancaccio, Titular Archbishop of Hadrianopolis in Haemimonto, serving as co-consecrators.

In March 1686, he succeeded to the bishopric of Chios. On 19 December 1698, he resigned as Bishop of Chios and was appointed during the papacy of Pope Innocent XI as Latin Archbishop of Corinth.
He died in December 1699.

While bishop, he was the principal co-consecrator of Nikola Bijanković, Bishop of Makarska (1699).

References 

17th-century Roman Catholic bishops in the Republic of Venice
Bishops appointed by Pope Clement IX
Bishops appointed by Pope Innocent XI
1636 births
1699 deaths
Clergy from Chios
Latin archbishops of Corinth
Roman Catholic bishops of Chios